Umāra ibn Abī al-Ḥasan al-Yamanī was a historian, jurist and poet of Yemen of great repute who was closely associated with the late Fatimid Caliphate of Egypt. He was executed by order of Saladin at Cairo on April 6, 1174 for his part in a conspiracy to restore Fatimid rule. His Tarikh al-Yaman is the earliest, and in respects the most important, history of Yemen from the Islamic era.

Biography
Invariably given the title al-faqīh ("The Jurist"), Umara was born ca. 1121.  His Tarikh gives the town of  al-Zara'ib, Ibb province in northern Yemen, as his place of birth.  The tribal district of the Banu Hakam is indicated by his denomination, "al-Hakami".  He was descended from the Qahtan tribe through al-Hakam ibn Saad al-Ashira of the Banu Madh'hij.  In 1136-7, he went to Zabid, where he studied jurisprudence for four years.  In 1154-5 while on pilgrimage to Mecca he came to the notice of the ruler of Mecca, Qasim ibn Abi Falita, who sent him as his envoy to the Isma'ili Fatimid Caliphate. In May 1155, Umara arrived at the court in Cairo of the six-year-old caliph Al-Fa'iz bi-Nasr Allah. The vizier Tala'i ibn Ruzzik was the effective ruler, styling himself al-Mālik aṣ-Ṣāliḥ, "The Virtuous King". In the presence of both, Umara recited his panegyric qasida. This short extract is a paraphrase:

Tala'i ibn Ruzzik, who surrounded himself with scholars, qāḍīs and kātibs, favoured Umara with distinction. Umara resided at  the Fatimid capital until December 1155 and by April 1156 had returned to Mecca, before journeying on to Zabid.  The same year Qasim once again sent him as envoy to Egypt, where he remained until his death. Ibn Ruzzik, a zealous Isma'ilite, failed to convert Umāra, who remained steadfast to his  Sunni orthodox faith and the Shafi'i school.  Despite their religious differences and due to Umara's great sociability, they became constant companions, Umara composing numerous eulogiums for the vizier and his sons.

In 1160 al-Fa'iz died aged 11 and Ibn Ruzzik placed his cousin al-Adid, also a minor, on the throne.  When Ibn Ruzzik died in 1161, he was briefly succeeded by his son, Ruzzik ibn Tala'i, who took the title al-Malik al-'Ādil al-Nāṣir.  Upon al-Adil's  assassination in 1162 the rival claimant  Shawar was installed as vizier with the aid of the Sultan of Aleppo, atabeg Nur ad-Din Mahmud, whose Kurdish general Shirkuh led his army into Egypt. A five-year struggle for control of the enfeebled Fatimid realm ensued between the Crusaders of the Kingdom of Jerusalem and Nur ad-Din, culminating in the killing of Shawar in 1168, and the accession of Nur ad-Din's representative, Shirkuh, to the vizierate. Shirkuh died later that year, and al-Aḍid invested the vizirate in Shirkuh's nephew, Saladin, who received the title of al-Mālik al-Nasir ("the Succouring King").  By 1171 al-Aḍid was on the point of death when he was formally deposed by Saladin as the last caliph of the Fatimid dynasty, and the suzerainty of the Abbasid Caliphate was restored over Egypt.

Conspiracy and execution
When a plot, involving Amalric of Jerusalem to restore Fatimid rule, was discovered, Umara was among the eight principal conspirators arrested. He and his co-conspirators were sentenced to death by strangulation. The execution took place at Cairo on a Saturday in April 1174.

Imad ad-Din al-Isfahani  wrote in his Kharīdat al-Kasr:

Evidence supporting the suspicion of Umara's involvement in the conspiracy had been his proposal for Turan Shah, Saladin’s brother, to lead an invasion force for the conquest of Yemen. The commander’s absence would have greatly increased the chances of the conspiracy succeeding.

Another factor may have been the influential head of Saladin's chancellery, al-Qadi al-Fadil (1135-1200).  Umara had for a time enjoyed amical relations with him, and it was al-Faḍl who had suggested to Umara to write a history of Yemen.  However they became bitter enemies and his hatred of Umara, and others' of Saladin's adherents, may have fed the suspicions.

Some of Umara's poems in honour of Saladin and his family are included in his Dīwān (collection of poetical works). However, in one addressed to Saladin, entitled Shikāya tal-Mutazallim wa Nikāya tal-Mutaāllim ("Complaint of the oppressed and pains of the afflicted"), he describes his miserable situation. In another, the “People of the Palace”, he openly laments the fall of the Fatimids.

Al-Maqrizi says the following poem composed by Umara was the cause of his death:

Umara was also accused of writing this dubious verse:

Idris Imad al-Din quotes verses of as-Salih ibn Ruzzik addressed to Umara, pressing him to become a Shi'ite. In the same page he observes  “Strange that Umara, who had refused to attach himself to the Fatimid Ismaili doctrines when they ruled, should have given his life to restore them to power.”

Works

The Land of Yemen and Its History (translated by Henry Cassels Kay into English and published with the title Yaman, its early mediaeval History by Najm ad-Dīn ‘Omārah Al-Ḥakami…; (original texts, with translation and notes; London: Edward Arnold, 1892), by  Umarah ibn Ali al-Hakami (1120 or 1121-1174), Ibn Khaldun, and Muhammad ibn Ya'qub Janadi.
An-Nukat al-Asriya il-Wuzarā il Misriya ((); (contemporary anecdotes respecting the vizirs of Egypt) 
Les finesses contemporaines, récits sur les vizirs d’Égypte; French-Arabic edition published by the French orientalist Hartwig Derenbourg. 
Dīwān of ‘Umāra, or unknown poems by two other editors introduced by ʻAbd al-Raḥmān ibn Ismāʻīl Abū Shāmah;  ca. 1250 into his  Kitāb al-Rawadhatayn fī Akhbār al-Dawlatayn, (Book Of Two Gardens) dedicated to the two rulers Nūr ad-Dīn and Saladin. (Bayrūt, Muʼassasat al-Risālah, 1997.)
ʻImād al-Dīn Muḥammad ibn Muḥammad Kātib al-Iṣfahānī  (1125-1201), Saladin’s first secretary for Syrian affairs, in Kharīdat al-qaṣr wa-jarīdat al-ʻaṣr published  Umāra's  poems and  a short biography in rhyming prose.
Mufid fi Akhbar Zabid ("Book of Instruction on the History of Zabid"),

Manuscripts
Manuscript A, Paris 610 de l’ancien fonds; Cat. No. 2147.
Manuscript B, Gotha 2256, described by Wilhelm Pertsch; Cat. IV, p. 268. 
Manuscript C, Oxford 835 (Marsh, 72; Uri, Catalogus p. 181).
Manuscript D. Asiatic Museum Saint Petersburg, Russia, 298.

See also
 Muslim scholars

Notes

Citations

References

 

1121 births
1174 deaths
12th-century Arab historians
12th-century Arabic poets
12th-century jurists
12th-century people from the Fatimid Caliphate
12th-century Egyptian historians
People executed by strangulation
Treason trials
Yemeni writers
12th-century executions
Scholars from the Ayyubid Sultanate
Yemeni Sunni Muslims
Ambassadors to the Fatimid Caliphate
Saladin